Villa Park is a city in northern Orange County, California, United States. It was founded in 1962. At the 2010 census, the city had a population of 5,812, the lowest population for a city in Orange County.

Within the city limits there is one small shopping center. City Hall, including a community room, and a branch of the Orange County Public Libraries system is adjacent to the city's only shopping center.

History 

After the 1769 expedition of Gaspar de Portolá, a Spanish expedition led by Father Junípero Serra named the area Vallejo de Santa Ana (Valley of Saint Anne). On November 1, 1776, Mission San Juan Capistrano became the areas first permanent European settlement in Alta California, New Spain. In 1810, the Spanish Empire granted  to Jose Antonio Yorba, which he named Rancho Santiago de Santa Ana. Yorba's rancho included the lands where the cities of Olive, Orange, Villa Park, Santa Ana, Tustin, Costa Mesa and Newport Beach stand today.

After the Mexican-American war in 1848, Alta California became part of the United States in 1850 and American settlers arrived in this area.

Villa Park was known as "Mountain View" in the 1860s. The U.S. Post Office refused to allow the local post office to be so named as there was already a post office with that name in Santa Clara County, so the post office and hence the area came to be called Villa Park after a town in Illinois. It was then an agricultural area producing, in turn, grapes, walnuts, and apricots. Finally, citrus became the major crop for about 60 years.

Ranchers established the Serrano Water District in 1876, which still provides Villa Park's water, and founded the Villa Park Orchards Association (still a business in Orange, although the packing house that was a local landmark was torn down in 1983).

Geography
Villa Park is located at  (33.816183, −117.811106).

There are no public parks within city limits; many homes have pools and/or tennis courts. Unlike more urban areas of Orange County west of the city, Villa Park has winding streets with few sidewalks and limited street lights. Throughout are trees and flower beds in planted medians and parkways. Surrounded by the city of Orange, Villa Park has the appearance of an enclave: the city's early unwillingness to annex lands beyond Santiago Creek and those east of a power line easement between the city and Anaheim Hills.

Demographics

2010
The 2010 United States Census reported that Villa Park had a population of 5,812. The racial makeup of Villa Park was 4,550 (78.3%) White (71.9% Non-Hispanic White), 42 (0.7%) African American, 34 (0.6%) Native American, 854 (14.7%) Asian, 1 (0.0%) Pacific Islander, 162 (2.8%) from other races, and 169 (2.9%) from two or more races. Hispanic or Latino of any race were 598 persons (10.3%).

The census reported that 5,767 people (99.2% of the population) lived in households, 40 (0.7%) lived in non-institutionalized group quarters, and 5 (0.1%) were institutionalized.

There were 1,976 households, out of which 625 (31.6%) had children under the age of 18 living in them, 1,525 (77.2%) were opposite-sex married couples living together, 123 (6.2%) had a female householder with no husband present, 80 (4.0%) had a male householder with no wife present.  There were 36 (1.8%) unmarried opposite-sex partnerships, and 8 (0.4%) same-sex married couples or partnerships. 208 households (10.5%) were made up of individuals, and 144 (7.3%) had someone living alone who was 65 years of age or older. The average household size was 2.92.  There were 1,728 families (87.4% of all households); the average family size was 3.11.

The population was spread out, with 1,164 people (20.0%) under the age of 18, 458 people (7.9%) aged 18 to 24, 845 people (14.5%) aged 25 to 44, 1,934 people (33.3%) aged 45 to 64, and 1,411 people (24.3%) who were 65 years of age or older.  The median age was 49.6 years. For every 100 females, there were 97.4 males. For every 100 females age 18 and over, there were 93.8 males.

The homeowner vacancy rate was 0.5%; the rental vacancy rate was 3.2%.  5,486 people (94.4% of the population) lived in owner-occupied housing units and 281 people (4.8%) lived in rental housing units.

2000
As of the census of 2000, there were 5,999 people, 1,950 households, and 1,764 families residing in the city. The population density was 2,844.9 inhabitants per square mile (1,097.7/km). The racial makeup of the city was 82.40% White, 0.80% African American, 0.43% Native American, 12.92% Asian, 0.03% Pacific Islander, 0.93% from other races, and 2.48% from two or more races. Hispanic or Latino of any race were 5.90% of the population.

There were 1,950 households, out of which 34.4% had children under the age of 18 living with them, 82.1% were married couples living together, 6.1% had a female householder with no husband present, and 9.5% were non-families. 7.9% of all households were made up of individuals, and 4.3% had someone living alone who was 65 years of age or older. The average household size was 3.07 and the average family size was 3.22.

In the city, the population was spread out, with 24.7% under the age of 18, 6.5% from 18 to 24, 21.2% from 25 to 44, 32.9% from 45 to 64, and 14.8% who were 65 years of age or older. The median age was 44 years. For every 100 females, there were 101.2 males. For every 100 females age 18 and over, there were 98.6 males.

The median income for a household in the city was $116,203, and the median income for a family was $124,852. Males had a median income of $78,563 versus $46,667 for females.

Government 

The city is governed by five council members each elected for four-year terms. The current (2022) representatives on the City Council include Mayor Chad Zimmerman, Mayor Pro-Tem Vince Rossini and Councilmembers Robert Collacott, Crystal Miles and Robbie Pitts.

Politics 
66.0% of the city's 4,533 registered voters declared their affiliation with the Republican party. 17.3% are registered Democrats, and 14.3% were unaffiliated voters.

On the Orange County Board of Supervisors, Villa Park is in the 3rd District, represented by Donald P. Wagner.

Villa Park is one of the most consistently Republican cities in Orange County and in California as a whole. Every GOP candidate for president since the city's incorporation in 1962 has received at least 60% of the vote in the city. From 1968 to 1988, the city gave the Republican candidate over 80% of the vote in each election, and in 2016, the city gave Donald Trump over 60% of the vote and a 30-point margin of victory despite the fact that he became the first Republican candidate to lose Orange County since Alf Landon in 1936. Trump would carry the city by a smaller, but still substantial margin in 2020 as well.

Villa Park is also largely Republican in California's gubernatorial elections. In 1978, even as Orange County supported Jerry Brown in his re-election bid, Villa Park gave his opponent Evelle Younger, 57% of the vote. In the GOP landslide victories of 1966, 1986, 1994, and 2006, the Republican candidates exceeded 80% of the vote in Villa Park.

NOTE: The totals listed for the 2003 governor's special election are the aggregate totals for all Republican candidates, all Democratic candidates, and all Independent candidates. Individually, Arnold Schwarzenegger received 2,391 votes, Cruz Bustamante received 234 votes, and Tom McClintock received 384 votes.

NOTE: In the 2016, and 2018 senate elections in California, both candidates on the ballot were Democrats. The bolded totals listed were those of the candidates that won Villa Park Kamala Harris in 2016, and Dianne Feinstein in 2018. The runners-up in Villa Park were shaded in blue as well, but wound up in the Republican column of this table.

Education

There are four public schools with the city that are operated by the Orange Unified School District (the city's largest employer).
 Serrano Elementary School
 Villa Park Elementary
 Cerro Villa Middle School
 Villa Park High School

Notable people 
Bert Blyleven, Major League Baseball player
Aaron Boone, Major League Baseball player and current manager of the New York Yankees
Rosalind Chao, actress
Aaron Corp, University of Richmond football quarterback
Kevin Costner, actor, graduated from Villa Park High School in 1973
Leigh Donovan, professional mountain bike racer, graduated from Villa Park High School in 1990
Jose Feliciano, singer, entertainer
Freddie Freeman, Major League Baseball player
Susan McCaw, former United States ambassador to Austria
Pat McInally, former National Football League player
Josh Samuels (born 1991), Olympic water polo player
L.J. Smith, author, The Vampire Diaries
James Sofronas, racing driver and entrepreneur
Mark Trumbo, Major League Baseball player, graduated from Villa Park High School in 2005
Del Worsham, professional drag racer

References

External links
 

1962 establishments in California
Cities in Orange County, California
Incorporated cities and towns in California
Populated places on the Santa Ana River